Kabigan Falls is a natural waterfall and tourist attraction in Brgy. Balaoi, Pagudpud, Ilocos Norte, Philippines.

It takes 10 to 15 minutes to get to the falls from the highway with the improved  access road leading to the waterfalls.

References

External links

Waterfalls of the Philippines
Geography of Ilocos Norte